Brendan Macken may refer to:

 Brendan Macken (tennis) (born 1923), former Canadian tennis player
 Brendan Macken (rugby union) (born 1991), Irish rugby player